The Cieszyn West County was short-lived county of Silesian Voivodeship, Poland in 1938. It was established following the incorporation of Trans-Olza region by Poland from Czechoslovakia on 2 October 1938. It was formed from Český Těšín District. On 27 October 1938, it was incorporated into the Cieszyn County. Its seat was located in Cieszyn Zachodni.

History 
Following the Munich Agreement signed on 30 September 1938, Germany incorporated the German-speaking area of Sudetenland, from Czechoslovakia. In context of such events, on 30 September 1938, Poland demanded Czechoslovakia to cede them  Polish-speaking area of Trans-Olza, which it did on 2 October 1938. The ceded area included Český Těšín District, which was subsequently renamed to Cieszyn West County, with its seat being placed in Cieszyn Zachodni. It existed until 27 October 1938, when it was incorporated into Cieszyn County. As such, provisional local governments were set up in the area, until proper government officials could have been elected. Area of former Cieszyn West County never was fully incorporated administratively into Cieszyn County, and all documentation continued to list incorporated area separately from the rest of the county, listing it as "western part of Cieszyn County".

Citations

Notes

References 

Silesian Voivodeship (1920–1939)
States and territories established in 1938
States and territories disestablished in 1938
Former counties of Poland
History of Czech Silesia
Cieszyn Silesia
Polish minority in Zaolzie